Harshaw is an unincorporated community located in Oneida County, Wisconsin, United States. Harshaw has a post office with ZIP code 54529. The community was named for Henry B. Harshaw, who was the treasurer of Wisconsin when Charles Norway established the post office in March 1851. The population in Harshaw is 1,167.

References

Unincorporated communities in Oneida County, Wisconsin
Unincorporated communities in Wisconsin